The L20 is rather small camera (even by compact standards), measuring , it weighs almost 135 g (including batteries and memory card). Its sister model L19 is about 4 g lighter, that's because its LCD is comparatively smaller. Like all in the series it has a shining plastic body built to Nikon's usual high standards and is pleasing to eye.

It is available in Deep Red (most popular), Navy Blue, Black Metallic and Bright Silver, while its variant L19 is present as Magenta and Shiny Pink as an extra choice.

References

External links
Page on Nikon Website
Nikon Lens Specifications
What MacWorld Has To Say
It's All-Around Show at youtube
Sample shots by Nikon Coolpix L20

Sample photographs

L020